Mariusz Ryszard Linke (31 July 1969 – 30 May 2022) was a Polish professional mixed martial artist and grappler.

Career
He was most notable for being the first Polish born black belt in Brazilian jiu-jitsu, the highest ranking active Polish judoka and BJJ practitioner in both mixed martial arts and grappling, and one of the most decorated grapplers in Poland. He was also the first Polish grappler to travel to Brazil and receive training under a Gracie trained Brazilian jiu-jitsu black belt. Linke notably competed in the European Championship, NAGA, Grapplers Quest, ADCC, and the Pan American Games. Linke was in talks with top Polish promotion Konfrontacja Sztuk Walki to negotiate a two-fight contract to close out his mixed martial arts career by the end of 2015, Linke stated despite retiring from fighting he would still continue his grappling career.

Death
On May 30, 2022 Linke died after contracting a staphylococcal infection earlier in the year, the bacterial infection later spread into his bloodstream and attached to his heart valves causing Linke to develop infective endocarditis.

Grappling titles and accomplishments

2017 Grapplers Quest Heavyweight Champion (Masters Gi) 
2016 European Championship - Bronze Medalist
2015 Pan American No-Gi Championship - Gold Medalist
2015 European Championship - Gold Medalist
2014 European Championship - Gold Medalist
2013 Pan American No-Gi Championship - Bronze Medalist
2012 European Championship - Gold and Silver Medalist
2012 NAGA Champion - Gold and Silver Medalist 
2011 London Open Champion 
2011 Pan American No-Gi Championship Competitor
2010 Eastern European Champion (Judo)
2008 NAGA Tournament Competitor
2007 European Championship - Bronze Medalist
2006 ADCC Polish Trials Champion
2005 Pan American Games Competitor
2004 Polish Open Champion (Judo)
2003 Pan American Games Competitor
2000 Eastern European Champion (Judo)
2000 European Judo Championships Competitor
1999 Polish National Champion (Judo)
1999 Bad Boy Cup Champion 
3 time Grapplers Quest Competitor (2008, 2011, 2012)

Other information
Mariusz received his Brazilian jiu-jitsu black belt under former Strikeforce fighter, coach and fight promoter Jorge Patino, Linke also had two training stints with current UFC fighter Cristiano Marcello during his stay in Brazil between 2001 and 2003 and again in 2005. Linke's nickname "Manolo" was taken from the movie Scarface, his personal friends said that Linke was really laid back and looked and acted like the character Manolo Ribera, played by Steven Bauer.

Linke was part of the BJJ lineage that began with the creator Mitsuyo Maeda and was later passed on to one of the founding instructors of Jiu-Jitsu in Brazil, Carlos Gracie.

Linke was one of very few BJJ practitioners to start at white belt and skip blue to purple, his instructors Jorge Patino and Cristiano Marcello mutually decided to skip Linke from white to purple in late 2002 due to his extensive Judo background, this skip in rank is a very rare occurrence and was the first person under Jorge Patino and first BJJ practitioner to join Chute Boxe Academy to do so.

Linke was also known for his outlandish appearance, covered in numerous tattoos and coloring his nails and hair to distract other fighters.

Maruisz produced the most black belts in Brazilian jiu-jitsu in Poland, as of 2017 he promoted 43 black belts in BJJ, 77 brown belts and over 200 purple belts.

After winning his gold medal at the Pan Jiu-Jitsu No-Gi Championship in 2015 Linke became the unofficial record breaking holder for most medals won in professional grappling and contact sports as a Polish competitor.

Mixed martial arts record

|-
|Win
|align=center|11-5
| PotocznyDawid Potoczny
| Submission (keylock)
| Imperium Arena: Fijaka vs. Ostrowski
|
|align=center|1
|align=center|2:22
|Szczecin, Poland
|Middleweight debut
|-
|Loss
|align=center|10-5
| GrzeskowiakMarcin Grzeskowiak
| TKO (shoulder injury)
| IFC: Winner's Punch
|
|align=center|1
|align=center|1:40
|Bydgoszcz, Poland
|
|-
|Loss
|align=center|10-4
| GracieGregor Gracie
| Submission (rear naked choke)
| BCFC: Gracie vs Linke
|
|align=center|1
|align=center|2:13
|Newark, New Jersey, United States
|Return to Welterweight
|-
|Win
|align=center|10-3
| BaranLukasz Baran
| TKO (punches)
| IFC - Tsunami Tournament 1
|
|align=center|1
|align=center|1:25
|Debrzno, Poland
|Fought at Lightweight
|-
|Win
|align=center|9-3
| BaranLukasz Baran
| Submission (standing arm-triangle choke)
| Bushido 6
|
|align=center|1
|align=center|0:20
|Szczecin, Poland
|Fought at Lightweight
|-
|Loss
|align=center|8-3
| SuleckiPiotr Sulecki
| TKO (corner stoppage)
| Iron Fist
|
|align=center|1
|align=center|1:30
|Szczecin, Poland
|Catchweight bout (166 lbs)
|-
|Win
|align=center|8-2
| MaciorTomasz Macior
| Submission (arm-triangle choke)
| Warriors Extreme Fighting
|
|align=center|1
|align=center|2:09
|Pila, Poland
|Lightweight debut
|-
|Win
|align=center|7-2
| PtaszynskiLukasz Ptaszynski
| Submission (arm-triangle choke)
| Bushido 5
|
|align=center|1
|align=center|3:32
|Szczecin, Poland
|
|-
|Win
|align=center|6-2
| ZakrzewskiSlawomir Zakrzewski
| Submission (arm-triangle choke)
| Bushido 3
|
|align=center|1
|align=center|1:43
|Szczecin, Poland
|
|-
|Win
|align=center|5-2
| IgnatowiczDonat Ignatowicz	
| Submission (kimura)
| Bushido 2
|
|align=center|1
|align=center|1:18
|Szczecin, Poland
|
|-
|Win
|align=center|4-2
| IgnatowiczDonat Ignatowicz	
| Submission (rear naked choke)
| Bushido 1
|
|align=center|1
|align=center|2:34
|Szczecin, Poland
|
|-
|Loss
|align=center|3-2
| KulikAndrzej Kulik	
| KO (stomp and punches) 
| Berserkers Arena 2
|
|align=center|1
|align=center|0:15
|Szczecin, Poland
|
|-
|Loss
|align=center|3-1
| AsmusRodrigo Durok Asmus	
| Submission (guillotine choke)
| Brazil Super Fight
|
|align=center|1
|align=center|4:35
|Alegre, Brazil
|
|-
|Win
|align=center|3-0
| GrabowskiDamian Grabowski
| Submission (rear naked choke) 	 	
| Berserkers Arena 1
|
|align=center|1
|align=center|1:36
|Szczecin, Poland
|
|-
|Win
|align=center|2-0
| BresDariusz Bres
| Submission (keylock) 	   	 	
| Polish All-Style Karate Organization - Japanese Gala
| 
|align=center|1
|align=center|1:23
|Siemiatycze, Poland
|
|-
|Win
|align=center|1-0
| Zakrzewski Slawomir Zakrzewski 
| Submission (triangle choke) 
| 13 International Boxing Tournament - Pomeranian Griffin Cup
|
|align=center|1
|align=center|24:00
|Szczecin, Poland
|

References

External links

1969 births
2022 deaths
Polish male mixed martial artists
Lightweight mixed martial artists
Mixed martial artists utilizing judo
Mixed martial artists utilizing Muay Thai
Mixed martial artists utilizing Brazilian jiu-jitsu
Polish male judoka
World judo champions
Brazilian jiu-jitsu trainers
Polish practitioners of Brazilian jiu-jitsu
People awarded a black belt in Brazilian jiu-jitsu
Sportspeople from Szczecin
Judoka trainers
Polish people of German descent
Polish Muay Thai practitioners
People from Zielona Góra
Sportspeople from Lubusz Voivodeship
Polish expatriate sportspeople in Portugal